To Mega Therion (Greek for "The Great Beast") may refer to:
 The Beast (Revelation), one of two beasts described in the Book of Revelation
 Aleister Crowley (1875–1947), British poet, mountaineer, occultist, and founder of Thelema


Music 
 Megatherion, a former name for the band Therion
 To Mega Therion (album), a 1985 album by extreme metal band Celtic Frost

Songs 
 "To Mega Therion", a song by Sinister from the 1995 album Hate
 "To Mega Therion", a song by Therion from the 1996 album Theli
 "To Mega Therion", a song by In Slaughter Natives from the 1992 album Enter Now the World

Other uses 
 Tomegatherion, a fictional character in the video game Body Harvest

See also 
 Megatherium, an extinct genus of ground sloths
 Therion (disambiguation)